El Viejín, (born José Jiménez in 1963 in Madrid), is a Spanish flamenco guitarist. He is often billed as José Jiménez 'El Viejín'.  "El viejín" means "a little old man".  He acquired this nickname when very young because listeners were amazed at his talent—thus, the nickname indicated that he played like a much older player.  Influenced by Sabicas like many of his contemporaries, he rose to fame as a flamenco guitarist in the late 1970s and 1980s and is one of the best-known Madrid-based flamenco guitarists. Transcriptions to his works have been created by a Madrid-based guitarist and musicologist Enrique Vargas and published by VG Ediciones  In 2008 he was reported to be "in the process of founding the Caño Roto school of flamenco guitar with his long-time friend Enrique Vargas."

Discography

Algo Que Decir ("Something to Say", Nuevos Medios S.A., 1999)

References

External links
Performance of "Rondeña"

1963 births
Living people
Spanish flamenco guitarists
Spanish male guitarists
Musicians from Madrid
Date of birth missing (living people)
Flamenco guitarists